Titao   is a department or commune of Loroum Province in north-western  Burkina Faso. Its capital is the town of Titao.

References

Departments of Burkina Faso
Loroum Province